Philip D. Morgan (born 1949) is a British historian. He has specialized in Early Modern colonial British America and slavery in the Americas. In 1999, he won both the Bancroft Prize and the Frederick Douglass Prize for his book Slave Counterpoint: Black Culture in the Eighteenth-Century Chesapeake and Lowcountry (1998).

Life
Born in England, Morgan graduated from Cambridge University and received his PhD from University College London.

Morgan taught at the College of William and Mary and was editor of the William and Mary Quarterly from 1997 to 2000. He teaches at Johns Hopkins University, where he is the Harry C. Black Professor of History, and during the 2011-12 academic year is the visiting Harmsworth Professor of American History at Oxford University.

Awards
For Slave Counterpoint (1998)
1998 American Historical Association, Albert J. Beveridge Award and Wesley Logan Prize
1999:
 Bancroft Prize;
 The first Frederick Douglass Prize, shared that year with the historian Ira Berlin, awarded by the Gilder Lehrman Center for the Study of Slavery, Yale University;
 Organization of American Historians, Elliott Rudwick Prize ;
 South Carolina Historical Society Prize;
 Library of Virginia Literary Nonfiction Award;
 Southern Historical Association, Frank L. and Harriet C. Owsley Prize; and
 American Philosophical Society, Jacques Barzun Prize (1999).

Works
   (reprint 1991)
 
 
 

Philip D. Morgan, David Eltis, eds. "New Perspectives on The Transatlantic Slave Trade," William and Mary Quarterly, LVIII (January 2001).

References

1949 births
21st-century American historians
21st-century American male writers
College of William & Mary faculty
Historians of the American Revolution
Historians of the Southern United States
Johns Hopkins University faculty
Living people
History of the Thirteen Colonies
Harold Vyvyan Harmsworth Professors of American History
Bancroft Prize winners
American male non-fiction writers